Riley Logan Ferguson (born January 19, 1995) is a former American football quarterback. He played college football at Memphis.

Early years
Ferguson attended David W. Butler High School in Matthews, North Carolina. He had 2,173 passing yards and 25 touchdowns as a senior and 3,345 yards and 48 touchdowns as a junior. He committed to the University of Tennessee to play college football.

College career
As a freshman at Tennessee in 2013, Ferguson competed with Justin Worley, Nathan Peterman and Joshua Dobbs for the starting quarterback job. Ferguson suffered a leg injury during practice and took a medical redshirt. He was again competing for the starting job in 2014, but left the school in May 2014.

Ferguson enrolled at Coffeyville Community College in 2015. In his one season at Coffeyville, he passed for 2,942 yards and had 35 touchdowns. He transferred to the University of Memphis in 2016. Ferguson was named the starter his first year at Memphis. In 13 starts, he threw for 3,698 yards and broke Paxton Lynch's previous years record with 32 touchdown passes.

Professional career

Tampa Bay Buccaneers
Ferguson, after finishing his senior year, entered the 2018 NFL Draft. Despite having the potential to be a sixth or seventh round pick, he went undrafted. He signed with the Tampa Bay Buccaneers as an undrafted free agent on April 29, 2018. On May 17, the Buccaneers waived Ferguson.

References

External links
Memphis Tigers bio
Tennessee Volunteers bio
 Kansas Jayhawk Community College Conference

1995 births
Living people
Players of American football from North Carolina
American football quarterbacks
Tennessee Volunteers football players
Coffeyville Red Ravens football players
Memphis Tigers football players
People from Matthews, North Carolina